Douglas Neville Daft AC (born 20 March 1943 in Cessnock, New South Wales) is an Australian businessman.

He graduated from the University of New England in Armidale, New South Wales in 1963 with a Bachelor of Arts degree, majoring in Mathematics. While at the University of New England he lived at Robb College.  During the 1960s he taught science at Vaucluse Boys' High School in Sydney. In 1970 he graduated from the University of New South Wales with a Diploma of Admin. He was CEO of Coca-Cola (2000–2004). In 2005, he was appointed Companion of the Order of Australia (AC) for his leadership in the global business community. He is currently a corporate director of Wal-Mart and on the advisory board of the Front Row Group of Companies Ltd. 

Douglas Daft now is advisor for Rothschild and sits on the board of trustees for preeminent Thunderbird School of Global Management.

References

External links

1943 births
Australian businesspeople
Coca-Cola people
Living people
Directors of Walmart
Companions of the Order of Australia
University of New South Wales alumni
People from the Hunter Region
N M Rothschild & Sons people